Kim Gun-hee (Hanja: 金健熙; born 22 February 1995) is a South Korean football forward who plays for Hokkaido Consadole Sapporo.

Club career 
Kim joined Suwon Samsung Bluewings in 2016 and made his professional debut against Gamba Osaka in AFC Champions League on 24 February 2016. On 3 May 2016, he scored 2 goals against Shanghai SIPG in AFC Champions League. Although they won the game three to zero, Suwon Samsung Bluewings couldn't advance to round of 16. He left the Suwon side to join Hokkaido Consadole Sapporo to play in the J1 League, in his first journey away from South Korea.

Club career statistics 
.

References

External links 
 

1995 births
Living people
Association football forwards
South Korean footballers
Suwon Samsung Bluewings players
Gimcheon Sangmu FC players
Hokkaido Consadole Sapporo players
K League 1 players
J1 League players
Korea University alumni
People from Jeonju
Sportspeople from North Jeolla Province
South Korean expatriate sportspeople in Japan
Expatriate footballers in Japan